Jean-Marie Rouart (born 8 April 1943 in Neuilly-sur-Seine) is a French novelist, essayist and journalist. He was elected to the Académie française on 18 December 1997.

Bibliography

1974 : La Fuite en Pologne  (Grasset)
1975 : La Blessure de Georges Aslo  (Grasset)
1977 : Les Feux du pouvoir - Prix Interallié  (Grasset)
1980 : Le Mythomane  (Grasset)
1983 : Avant-guerre - Prix Renaudot  (Grasset )
1985 : Ils ont choisi la nuit - Prix de l'Essai de l'Académie française (Grasset )
1987 : Le Cavalier blessé  (Grasset )
1989 : La Femme de proie  (Grasset)
1990 : Le Voleur de jeunesse  (Grasset)
1993 : Le Goût du malheur  (Gallimard)
1994 : Omar, la construction d’un coupable  (Le Fallois)
1995 : Morny, un voluptueux au pouvoir  (Gallimard)
1997 : L’Invention de l’amour  (Grasset)
1998 : La Noblesse des vaincus  (Grasset)
1998 : Bernis, le cardinal des plaisirs  (Gallimard)
2000 : Une jeunesse à l’ombre de la lumière  (Gallimard)
2000 : Discours de réception à l'Académie française  (Grasset)
2001 : Une famille dans l'impressionisme  (Gallimard)
2002 : Nous ne savons pas aimer  (Gallimard)
2003 : Adieu à la France qui s'en va  (Grasset)
2004 : Libertin et chrétien  (Desclée de Brouwer)
2005 : Mes fauves  (Grasset)
2006 : Le Scandale  (Gallimard)
2008 : Devoir d'insolence, Grasset
2009 : Cette opposition qui s'appelle la vie, Grasset

External links 
  L'Académie française
  Official web site

1943 births
Living people
People from Neuilly-sur-Seine
Members of the Académie Française
Prix Renaudot winners
Prix Maurice Genevoix winners
Prix Interallié winners
20th-century French novelists
21st-century French novelists
20th-century French journalists
21st-century French journalists
French male novelists
French male essayists
French male journalists
Paris Match writers
20th-century French essayists
21st-century French essayists
20th-century French male writers
21st-century French male writers
Commandeurs of the Ordre des Arts et des Lettres
Officers of the Ordre national du Mérite
Officiers of the Légion d'honneur